Alter Ego is an American music competition game show that aired on Fox from September 22 to December 8, 2021. The series is hosted by Rocsi Diaz.

The premise of the show is that the contestants sing backstage while motion capture technology creates digital avatars that appear in their place.

Format 
In the series, contestants stand backstage while singing and dancing, as motion capture technology projects an avatar on stage that moves when the person does. The judges then decide who has the best performance.

Production 
On May 17, 2021, it was announced that Fox had ordered the series, with Matilda Zoltowski as executive producer. On July 16, Rocsi Diaz was announced as host of the show, with Alanis Morissette, Nick Lachey, Grimes and will.i.am serving as judges. On July 26, it was announced that Alter Ego would premiere on September 22, following the sixth season premiere of The Masked Singer and a sneak peek episode that aired on September 12. On September 10, the contestants were announced. On May 16, 2022, Fox shelved the series indefinitely.

Contestants

Weeks

Week 1 (September 22 and 23) 

Reveal Song: "The Best Is Yet to Come" by Frank Sinatra

Reveal Song: "Bye Bye Bye" by *NSYNC

Week 2 (September 29) 

Reveal Song: "This Is Me" by Keala Settle

Week 3 (October 6) 

Reveal Song: "Check Yes or No" by George Strait

Week 4 (October 13) 

Reveal Songs: "Because You Loved Me" by Celine Dion; "I'm the Only One" by Melissa Etheridge

Week 5 (October 20) 

Reveal Songs: "Rise Up" by Andra Day; "Always Remember Us This Way" by Lady Gaga

Week 6 (November 3) 

Reveal Songs: "I Want You To Want Me" by Cheap Trick; "A Thousand Years" by Christina Perri

Week 7 (November 10) 

Reveal Songs: "Let It Go" by James Bay; "I Try" by Macy Gray

Week 8 (November 17) 

Reveal Songs: "Last Dance" by Donna Summer; "Your Song" by Elton John

Week 9 (December 1) 

Reveal Songs: "Say Something" by A Great Big World & Christina Aguilera; "Hold On, I'm Comin'" by Sam & Dave

Week 10 (December 8) 

Reveal Songs: "I'm Like a Bird" by Nelly Furtado; "Fix You" by Coldplay; "If I Were a Boy" by Beyoncé; "How to Save a Life" by The Fray

Episodes

Special

Reception
Metacritic gave Alter Ego a 34 out of a 100 based on 5 reviews.

Ratings

International versions

Notes

See also
 Virtual band
 Virtual concert

References

External links 
 
 

2020s American music television series
2020s American reality television series
2020s American game shows
2021 American television series debuts
2021 American television series endings
American television series based on Spanish television series
English-language television shows
Fox Broadcasting Company original programming
Television series by Fox Entertainment